The 1994 Buffalo Bulls football team represented the University at Buffalo in the 1994 NCAA Division I-AA football season. The Bulls offense scored 156 points while the defense allowed 331 points.

Schedule

References

Buffalo
Buffalo Bulls football seasons
Buffalo Bulls football